Ian Christopher Hallard (born 9 November 1974) is an English actor and writer. His work includes acting roles in the West End, including the lead role of Michael in a revival of Mart Crowley's The Boys in the Band; at the National Theatre and on television. He has also written and script edited for both television and stage.

Early and personal life
Hallard was born in Birmingham, West Midlands, on 9 November 1974. Following his education at Solihull School and an undergraduate degree at the University of Sheffield, he trained at the Mountview Academy of Theatre Arts on the Post Graduate Acting course, won a singing scholarship, and graduated in 1998. He lives with his husband, the actor and screenwriter Mark Gatiss. The couple live in Islington in London.

Career

Theatre
Hallard has been acting professionally since 1999, when he appeared in a production of Seven Brides for Seven Brothers at the Battersea Arts Centre. Since then his roles have included Sordo in Scenes from an Execution at the Royal National Theatre, Lysander in A Midsummer Night's Dream, Bill Taylor in the Michael Frayn farce Donkeys' Years, Jack Worthing in The Importance of Being Earnest and Judah in Joseph and the Amazing Technicolor Dreamcoat. His recent work includes the National Theatre production Great Britain by Richard Bean in the ensemble multi-character role of Jimmy the Bins/ St. John/Felix. In 2015 he played the leading role of Alan Turing in the UK premiere of the Snoo Wilson play Lovesong of the Electric Bear at the Arts Theatre.

He played the lead role of Michael in a revival of Mart Crowley's The Boys in the Band at the Park Theatre (London) and on a short UK tour in autumn 2016. He then reprised the role when the show transferred to the Vaudeville Theatre in February 2017. His performance led to him being nominated as Best Actor in the Whatsonstage.com theatre awards, alongside Ian McKellen, Jamie Parker, Kenneth Branagh, and Ralph Fiennes.

In 2019, he starred in the revival of Closer to Heaven, the musical written by Jonathan Harvey and Pet Shop Boys at Above the Stag Theatre.

In March 2021, he played the role of Richard in the first play he wrote, Adventurous, produced by Jermyn Street Theatre.
For the 2021/22 panto season, he was the panto dame in Beauty and the Beast at the Towngate Theatre, also starring Simon Fielding, Sophie Ladds and Madeleine Leslay.
For the 2022/23 panto season, he will appear as Mrs Smee in Peter Pan at the Towngate again alongside Sophie Ladds.

Television
Hallard has appeared in cult BBC TV shows such as Doctor Who as Alan-a-Dale in the 2014 episode "Robot of Sherwood"; in Sherlock as Mr Crayhill in the 2011 episode "The Reichenbach Fall", and on the long-running BBC Daytime TV series Doctors. He played one of the original directors of Doctor Who, Richard Martin, in the BBC docu-drama An Adventure in Space and Time. He appears in the sixth episode of the second season (“Vergangenheit”) of Netflix's series The Crown, as an employee of the minister of foreign affairs.

Writing
Hallard co-wrote The Big Four (2013) with Mark Gatiss for the ITV series Agatha Christie: Poirot, starring David Suchet. He was the Script Associate on the Poirot episodes Cat Among the Pigeons (2008) and Hallowe'en Party (2010).

His debut play Adventurous was produced by Jermyn Street Theatre, and streamed online from 16–28 March 2021.

Other writing for theatre includes Horse-Play at Riverside Studios, a comedy starring David Ames, Jake Maskall and Matt Lapinskas; and The Way Old Friends Do, which has been announced as premiering at Birmingham Repertory Theatre in February 2023.

Selected filmography

References

External links
 
 

1974 births
Living people
20th-century English male actors
21st-century English male actors
English gay actors
English male television actors
People from Birmingham, West Midlands